Ivan Kuret (born 22 December 1971) is a Croatian politician who served as the 69th Mayor of Split from 2007 to 2009. 

He graduated from the University of Split with a degree in engineering. He is a member of the centre-right Croatian Democratic Union (HDZ). He was elected the mayor on 17 July 2007, after the city council revoked confidence in the his predecessor, Zvonimir Puljić. He was succeeded on 1 June 2009 by Željko Kerum.

Kuret was also a sailor, and competed in the men's 470 event at the 1996 Summer Olympics.

References

1971 births
Living people
Mayors of Split, Croatia
Croatian Democratic Union politicians
Croatian male sailors (sport)
Olympic sailors of Croatia
Sailors at the 1996 Summer Olympics – 470